Bisko is a village in Croatia. It is connected by the D220 highway.

References

Populated places in Split-Dalmatia County